This is a list of vehicles enhanced by Australian company Holden Special Vehicles, the performance vehicle partner of Holden. They were primarily based on the donor Commodore (short-wheelbase) or Statesman/Caprice (long-wheelbase) platforms and marketed under the HSV brand name, unless otherwise indicated.

Holden-based models

VL series 
Holden Commodore SS Group A SV (VL)
SV88 (VL)
F20 SV (VL)

VN, VG and VQ series 
SV3800 (VN)
SV89 (VN)
SV6 (VN)
SV LE (VN)
GTS V6 (VN; New Zealand special)
LE (VN)
SV5000 (VN)
8 Plus (VN)
DMG90 (VN)
Challenger (VN)
SV T-30 (VN and VN Series II)
ClubSport (VN)
Statesman SV90 (VQ)
Maloo (VG)
Holden Commodore SS Group A SV (VN)
Plus 6 (VN)
SV91 (VN prototype)
Statesman 5000i (VQ)
LS sedan and wagon (VN)
LS utility (VG)

VP series 
LS utility (VP)
ClubSport,   including "5th Anniversary" edition (VP)
Sport Wagon, including "5th Anniversary" edition (VP)
SV91 (VP)
+Six (VP and VP Series II)
Maloo, including "5th Anniversary" edition (VP)
Senator 5000i, including "5th Anniversary" edition (VP and VP Series II)
Statesman 5000i Series II, including "5th Anniversary" edition (VQ Series II)
Nitron (VP)
GTS (VP and VP Series II)
Statesman SV93, including "5th Anniversary" edition (VQ Series II)
GTS V6 (VP; New Zealand special)
Formula (VP Series II)
ClubSport 5000i (VP Series II)
Senator (VP Series II)

VR and VS series 
ClubSport sedan and wagon (VR, VS and VS Series II)
Senator 185i and 215i (VR, VS and VS Series II)
Maloo, including "5th Anniversary" edition (VR, VS, VS Series II, "VS Series II at VT" and VS Series III)
GTS (VR, VS and VS Series II)
Statesman 185i and 215i (VR and VS)
Caprice 215i (VR, VS and VS Series II)
Manta sedan and wagon (VS and VS Series II)
GTS-R (VS Series II)
Grange 185i and 215i (VS Series II and III)

VT and WH Series 
Manta (VT)
Clubsport, including "10th Anniversary" edition (VT and VT Series II)
Senator Signature 195i sedan and wagon (VT)
Senator Signature 220i, including "10th Anniversary" edition (VT)
GTS (VT)
XU6, including "10th Anniversary" edition (VT and VT Series II)
XU8 (VT)
Clubsport R8 (VT Series II)
Senator V6 supercharged (VT Series II)
Senator 250i (VT Series II)
Senator Signature 250i sedan and wagon (VT Series II)
SV99 (VT Series II)
Grange V6 supercharged and 250i (WH)
GTS 300i (VT Series II)
Clubsport "Hackett" edition (VT Series II)

VX, VU, WH and V2 series 
XU6 (VX and VX Series II)
Clubsport and R8, including "15th Anniversary" edition (VX and VX Series II)
Senator Signature 255i (VX and VX Series II)
GTS (VX)
Maloo, with R8 option and including "15th Anniversary" edition (VU and VU Series II)
Senator 300i (VX)
SV300 (VX)
Grange 255i (WH Series II)
GTO and GTS Coupé (V2)

Y, V2 and WK series 
Clubsport and R8 (Y and Y Series II)
GTS (Y and Y Series II)
Senator (Y and Y Series II)
Senator Signature (Y and Y Series II)
Maloo and R8 (Y and Y Series II)
GTO and GTS Coupé (V2 Series II and III; exported as the Vauxhall Monaro VXR)
Grange (WK)
Coupé LE (V2 Series III)
Avalanche and XUV (Y Series II)
Coupé4 (V2 Series III)
Clubsport SE (Y series II)

Z and WL series 
Coupé4 (Z)
Clubsport and R8 (Z and Z Series II)
Grange (WL)
GTO Coupé (Z; exported as the Vauxhall Monaro VXR)
Avalanche and XUV (Z)
SV6000 (Z)
Clubsport and Clubsport R8 "Dealer Team Spec" (Z)
GTO Coupé "Dealer Team Spec" (Z)
Maloo and R8, including "15th Anniversary" (Z and Z Series II)
Clubsport R (Z)
Clubsport R8 "Holden Racing Team" and "Toll HSV Team" (Z Series II)
Senator Signature "Mark Skaife" (Z)
GTO Coupé LE (Z)
Coupé Signature (Z)

E and WM series 
Clubsport and R8 sedan and Tourer (E; R8 exported as the Chevrolet Special Vehicles CR8 and Vauxhall VXR8)
GTS (E and E Series II, III)
Clubsport "20th Anniversary" edition (E)
Grange (WM and WM Series II, III)
Maloo R8 (E and E Series II)
W427 (E)
Clubsport R8 "Murph Special Edition" (E; New Zealand special)
Maloo R8 "Murph Special Edition" (E; New Zealand special)
Senator SV08 (E)
Clubsport R8 (E Series II and III)
Senator Limited Edition (E Series II)
Clubsport R8 GXP (E Series II)
Clubsport "20th Anniversary" edition (E Series II)
Maloo GXP (E Series II)
Maloo and R8 (E Series III)
Maloo R8 "20 Years of Maloo" edition (E Series III)
Clubsport R8 "SV Black Edition" sedan and Tourer (E Series III)
Maloo "SV Black Edition" sedan and Tourer (E Series III)
Clubsport R8 SV-R (E Series III; Queensland Police special)
Clubsport and R8 (E Series III "MY12.5" update)
GTS (E Series III "MY12.5" update)

Gen-F series 
Clubsport and R8 sedan and Tourer (Gen-F and "MY15" update; R8 exported as the Vauxhall VXR8)
GTS (Gen-F and "MY15" update; exported as the Vauxhall VXR8 GTS)
Grange (Gen-F and "MY15" update)
Maloo, R8 and "SV Enhanced" (Gen-F and "MY15" update)
GTS Maloo (Gen-F)
Senator SV (Gen-F "MY15" update)
Clubsport R8 "25th Anniversary" edition (Gen-F "MY15" update)

Non-Holden models  
Astra SV1800 (LD series)
Jackaroo (UBS series)
Astra VXR and "Nürburgring" edition (AH series)
SportsCat

Concept cars 
1989 VN convertible (featuring VP front styling)
2001 HRT Maloo utility
2002 HRT 427 coupé 
2004 GTS-R coupé

References